Peter Barron (born 1962) is a Northern Irish journalist and Google's head of communications for Europe, Middle East and Africa.

Peter Barron or Baron may also refer to:

Peter-James Barron (born 1989), Irish cross-country skier
Petr Baron (born 1980), Russian businessman
Peter Baron (MP), Member of Parliament  for Coventry